Eucalyptus astringens, commonly known as brown mallet or to Noongar people as mallat, woonert or wurnert, is a tree that is endemic to the South West region of Western Australia. It has smooth, shiny bark on its trunk and branches, lance-shaped leaves, pendulous flower buds arranged in groups of seven, cream-coloured to pale lemon-coloured flowers and cup-shaped to bell-shaped or conical fruit. This tree has also been introduced to Victoria.

Description
It has smooth grey-brown coloured bark that peels from the trunk and branches. It blooms from August to December and produces white cream to yellow flowers. The concolorous, glossy, green adult leaves have an alternate arrangement. The unbranched inflorescences have an axillary arrangement. Each inflorescence is seven-flowered with flattened peduncles around  flattened. The buds are pedicellate with a stubby to elongated shape. The fruits that form later are pedicellate and cupular to campanulate. They each have a level to descending disc with three or four valves containing grey-black seeds with an ovoid to flattened-ovoid shape.

Taxonomy
Brown mallet was first formally described in 1911 by Joseph Maiden who gave it the name Eucalyptus occidentalis var. astringens and published the description in the Journal of the Natural History and Science Society of Western Australia. In 1924, Maiden raised the variety to species status in his book A Critical Revision of the Genus Eucalyptus. The specific epithet (astringens) is a Latin word meaning "shrinking" or "binding".

In 2002, Ian Brooker and Stephen Hopper described two subspecies:
 Eucalyptus astringens subsp. redacta is a smaller mallet with smaller buds and fruit than the autonym.

Distribution
Brown mallet is commonly found on rocky outcrops, ridges, breakaways, hills and on valley floors in the southern Wheatbelt, Great Southern and south west Goldfields-Esperance regions of Western Australia. It grows in red-brown gravelly clay, brown clayey sand, sandy loam, spongolite, laterite and sandstone based soils.

It is commonly associated with E. wandoo making up the overstorey, especially when E. wandoo woodland is an adjacent community. Understorey species often include occasional Santalum acuminatum and Melaleuca scalena, and a sparse ground cover of common grasses and herbs such as Thysanotus patersonii, Trachymene pilosa, Pterostylis sanguineus, Austrostipa elegantissima, Austrodanthonia setacea group and Lomandra micrantha subsp. micrantha.

E. astringens has become naturalised in Bacchus Marsh, north of Melbourne, in Victoria, where it had been used to stabilise soils.

Uses
The wood from the tree is used for construction, mining timbers and for tool handles. It is also a good firewood. The bark contains around 40% tannin and could possibly be used for tanning leather and production of adhesives.
Around  of the tree have been planted around Narrogin in plantations for timber production.

See also

List of Eucalyptus species

References

astringens
Endemic flora of Western Australia
Mallees (habit)
Myrtales of Australia
Eucalypts of Western Australia
Trees of Australia
Plants described in 1911
Taxa named by Joseph Maiden